MacArthur High School, located at 4400 Aldine Mail Route in East Aldine, unincorporated Harris County, Texas, United States, north of Houston, with a ZIP code of 77039. The school is named in honor of Douglas MacArthur.

The school serves sections of the unincorporated area of Aldine.

History 
MacArthur High School opened in 1965 and is the third high school in the Aldine Independent School District. The main campus (commonly referred by its students as "big mac") serves grades 10 through 12, while MacArthur Ninth Grade Center (commonly referred by its students as "little mac") serves grade 9.

MacArthur has numerous programs available to students. Among those programs are Tech-Prep, Advanced Placement classes, National Honors Society, and JROTC. In conjugation with a partnership with Lonestar College, it also offers opportunities for students in Health Science, Tech-Prep, Emergency Medical, and dual credit courses to continue their education at the college level while still in high school.

MacArthur’s award-winning jazz band has gained national recognition, as have participants in National History Day, Career and Technology, and chess. MacArthur students have also earned state honors in speech and debate, choir, dance, band and cross-country state and national champions in 1991.

Academics
For the 2018-2019 school year, the school received a C grade from the Texas Education Agency, with an overall score of 79 out of 100. The school received a C grade in two domains, Student Achievement (score of 73) and Closing the Gaps (score of 71), and a B grade in School Progress (score of 82). The school received one of the seven possible distinction designations for Academic Achievement in Mathematics.

Demographics
In the 2018-2019 school year, there were 2,826 students. 5.8% were African American, 0.1% were Asian, 92.3% were Hispanic, 0.1% were American Indian, 1.5% were White, and 0.2% were two or more races. 87.4% of students were Economically Disadvantaged, 18.5% were English Language Learners, and 7.7% received Special Education services.

Feeder pattern
Elementary schools that feed into MacArthur High School include:
 Escamilla Elementary
 Francis Elementary
 Johnson Elementary
 Mendel Elementary
 Oleson Elementary
 Orange Grove Elementary
 Raymond Academy
 Reed Elementary
 Stephens Elementary
 Worsham Elementary
Middle schools that feed into MacArthur High School include:
 Aldine Middle School
 Grantham Academy
 Hambrick Middle School
 Mead Middle School
Ninth Grade Schools that feed into MacArthur High School include:
 MacArthur Ninth Grade School

Notable alumni
Alberto Gonzales, former U.S. Atty General
Debra Hobbs (Class of 1973), Republican member for the Arkansas House of Representatives from Rogers; candidate for Lieutenant Governor of Arkansas in 2014
Tony Hutson (Class of 1991), former NFL player
 Paul Mills (Class of 1990), current head men's basketball coach at Oral Roberts University
Jose Portilla, American football player
Brian Bevil, former Major League Baseball player, Kansas City Royals

References

External links 
 

Educational institutions established in 1965
Aldine Independent School District high schools
Public high schools in Texas
1965 establishments in Texas